The Reserve Artillery Division of Shandong Provincial Military District() is a reserve artillery formation of the People's Liberation Army.

The Reserve Artillery Division of Jining() was activated in July 1987 at Jining, Shandong. 

In 1999 the division was reorganized as the Reserve Artillery Division of Shandong Provincial Military District. 

The division was now composed of:
1st Artillery Regiment - Qingdao, Shandong
2nd Artillery Regiment - Jimo, Shandong
3rd Artillery Regiment - Jiaozhou, Shandong
4th Artillery Regiment - Rongcheng, Shandong

References

Reserve divisions of the People's Liberation Army
Military units and formations established in 1987